Arbeit macht frei (Work sets you free) is the debut album of the Jazz fusion band Area. It features Patrick Djivas (now known better for his work with Premiata Forneria Marconi) on bass and Eddie Busnello on saxophone, who parted after the release of the album. According to the booklet the lyrics were written by Frankestein (which is an alias for Gianni Sassi), and the music was written by Demetrio Stratos, Giulio Capiozzo and Patrick Djivas except "Consapevolezza" (co-writing with Patrizio Fariselli). All tracks were registered on Italian SIAE to Terzo Fariselli (Patrizio's father), due to the fact that the musicians were not members of SIAE.

"Luglio, Agosto, Settembre (nero)" became Area's first hit. Most of the 7" censored the word "nero", which was a reference to Black September). It was released as a juke box item only, and the b-side was the song "Miña" by Italian prog band Aktuala. On the posthumous live release "Concerto Teatro Uomo", Demetrio Stratos says that "L'abbattimento dello Zeppelin" was composed after a pub at which they were playing asked them to perform "Whole Lotta Love". They didn't know the song and played that one instead, and they got fired. Guitarist Paolo Tofani can be heard quoting the main riff during his solo. "L'abbattimento dello Zeppelin" was also released as a 7", backed by the title track of the album, but failed to enter the charts.

Track listing
Side one
"Luglio, Agosto, Settembre (nero)" – 4:27
 "Arbeit macht frei" – 7:56
 "Consapevolezza" – 6:06

Side two
 "Le labbra del tempo" – 6:00
 "240 chilometri da Smirne" – 5:10
 "L'Abbattimento dello Zeppelin" – 6:45

Personnel
Eddie Busnello - saxophone
Giulio Capiozzo - drums, percussion
Patrick Djivas - bass, double bass
Patrizio Fariselli - electric and acoustic pianos
Demetrio Stratos - vocals, organ, steel drums
Giampaolo Tofani - guitar, VCS3
Ria Gaetano - engineering

References

1973 albums
Area (band) albums
Italian-language albums